Clayton Clealand Bickley Mitchell (11 December 1900 – 1 July 1988) was an Australian politician. He was the Country Party member for Stirling in the Western Australian Legislative Assembly from 1962 to 1971.

References

1900 births
1988 deaths
National Party of Australia members of the Parliament of Western Australia
Members of the Western Australian Legislative Assembly
People from Donnybrook, Western Australia
20th-century Australian politicians